Mîncenii de Jos is a commune in Rezina District, Moldova. It is composed of two villages, Mîncenii de Jos and Mîncenii de Sus.

References

Communes of Rezina District